The PSM (Pistolet Samozaryadny Malogabaritny, Russian for "compact self-loading pistol") was designed by the Tula Design Bureau in 1969  as a self-defense firearm for law enforcement and military officers of the USSR. The pistol entered production at the Izhevsk Mechanical Plant in 1973.

The PSM is a blowback-operated handgun with a double-action trigger and slide-mounted manual safety without a slide stop. The grip panels are made from thin aluminum and new model with hard plastic. The weapon is made from steel.

The PSM was designed around the newly developed 5.45×18mm cartridge, which was developed for the weapon by Precision Mechanical Engineering Central Research Institute. The cartridge is capable of penetrating 55 layers of kevlar at realistic engagement distances. However, this is purely a consequence of its hard metal core and the bullet wasn't designed to defeat body armor.  This cartridge has a bottlenecked case and a spitzer-pointed jacketed bullet. 

The pistol was primarily intended for army high command staff. However, owing to its insignificant dimensions, especially small thickness (21 mm across the safety catch), it soon became popular with security (KGB) and law enforcement (militsiya) personnel. The PSM was also appreciated by higher echelon Communist Party functionaries.

Other designations
 MPTs (Malokalibernyj Pistolet Tsentralnogo-boya; "Small-caliber Pistol, Center-fire")

Variants
 IZh-75 (ИЖ-75) - an export model in .25 ACP.
 IZh-78 (ИЖ-78) - 7.6mm gas pistol
 IZh-78-9T (ИЖ-78-9Т) - 9mm non-lethal pistol (9mm P.A.K.)

Users

 
 
  - custom service
 
 
  - police

See also
 List of Russian weaponry

References

External links

5.45×18mm firearms
Cold War firearms of the Soviet Union
Semi-automatic pistols of the Soviet Union
KBP Instrument Design Bureau products
Izhevsk Mechanical Plant products